The 1996–97 QMJHL season was the 28th season in the history of the Quebec Major Junior Hockey League. The league continues explore new markets as the Saint-Hyacinthe Laser move north to Rouyn-Noranda, Quebec. The New Faces Cup is renamed the RDS Cup, for its new sponsor, Réseau des sports. Fourteen teams played 70 games each in the schedule. The Hull Olympiques finished first overall in the regular season winning their third Jean Rougeau Trophy, and won their fourth President's Cup, defeating the Chicoutimi Saguenéens in the finals.

Team changes
 The Saint-Hyacinthe Laser relocated to Rouyn-Noranda, Quebec, becoming the Rouyn-Noranda Huskies. 
 The Moncton Alpines are renamed the Moncton Wildcats.

Final standings
Note: GP = Games played; W = Wins; L = Losses; T = Ties; Pts = Points; GF = Goals for; GA = Goals against

complete list of standings.

Scoring leaders
Note: GP = Games played; G = Goals; A = Assists; Pts = Points; PIM = Penalty minutes

 complete scoring statistics

Playoffs
Frederic Bouchard was the leading scorer of the playoffs with 51 points (22 goals, 29 assists).

All-star teams
First team
 Goaltender - Marc Denis, Chicoutimi Saguenéens
 Left defence - Derrick Walser, Beauport Harfangs / Rimouski Océanic
 Right defence - Stéphane Robidas, Shawinigan Cataractes 
 Left winger - Philippe Audet, Granby Prédateurs 
 Centreman - Daniel Corso, Victoriaville Tigres 
 Right winger - Pavel Rosa, Hull Olympiques 
 Coach - Clément Jodoin, Halifax Mooseheads

Second team  
 Goaltender - Jean-Sébastien Giguère, Halifax Mooseheads 
 Left defence - Radoslav Suchy, Sherbrooke Faucons / Chicoutimi Saguenéens
 Right defence - Frédéric Bouchard, Rouyn-Noranda Huskies / Chicoutimi Saguenéens
 Left winger - Jean-Pierre Dumont, Val-d'Or Foreurs 
 Centreman - Daniel Brière, Drummondville Voltigeurs 
 Right winger - Eric Normandin, Rimouski Océanic 
 Coach - Alain Rajotte, Victoriaville Tigres

Rookie team  
 Goaltender - Christian Bronsard, Hull Olympiques 
 Left defence - François Beauchemin, Laval Titan Collège Français & Jeffrey Sullivan, Granby Prédateurs / Halifax Mooseheads
 Right defence - Jonathan Girard, Laval Titan Collège Français 
 Left winger - Alex Tanguay, Halifax Mooseheads 
 Centreman - Vincent Lecavalier, Rimouski Océanic 
 Right winger - Gregor Baumgartner, Laval Titan Collège Français 
 Coach - Denis Francoeur, Shawinigan Cataractes
 List of First/Second/Rookie team all-stars.

Trophies and awards
Team
President's Cup - Playoff Champions, Hull Olympiques
Jean Rougeau Trophy - Regular Season Champions, Hull Olympiques
Robert Lebel Trophy - Team with best GAA, Hull Olympiques

Player
Michel Brière Memorial Trophy - Most Valuable Player, Daniel Corso, Victoriaville Tigres 
Jean Béliveau Trophy - Top Scorer, Pavel Rosa, Hull Olympiques 
Guy Lafleur Trophy - Playoff MVP, Christian Bronsard, Hull Olympiques  
Ford Cup – Offensive - Offensive Player of the Year, Pavel Rosa, Hull Olympiques    
Ford Cup – Defensive - Defensive Player of the Year, Jean-Sébastien Giguère, Halifax Mooseheads     
AutoPro Plaque - Best plus/minus total, Pavel Rosa, Hull Olympiques  
Jacques Plante Memorial Trophy - Best GAA, Marc Denis, Chicoutimi Saguenéens
Emile Bouchard Trophy - Defenceman of the Year, Stéphane Robidas, Shawinigan Cataractes    
Mike Bossy Trophy - Best Pro Prospect, Roberto Luongo, Val-d'Or Foreurs   
RDS Cup - Rookie of the Year, Vincent Lecavalier, Rimouski Océanic 
Michel Bergeron Trophy - Offensive Rookie of the Year, Vincent Lecavalier, Rimouski Océanic   
Raymond Lagacé Trophy - Defensive Rookie of the Year, Christian Bronsard, Hull Olympiques    
Frank J. Selke Memorial Trophy - Most sportsmanlike player, Daniel Brière, Drummondville Voltigeurs   
QMJHL Humanitarian of the Year - Humanitarian of the Year, Jason Groleau, Victoriaville Tigres    
Marcel Robert Trophy - Best Scholastic Player, Luc Vaillancourt, Beauport Harfangs

Executive
Ron Lapointe Trophy - Coach of the Year, Clément Jodoin, Halifax Mooseheads    
John Horman Trophy - Executive of the Year, Harold MacKay, Halifax Mooseheads   
St-Clair Group Plaque - Marketing Director of the Year, Matt McKnight, Halifax Mooseheads 
Paul Dumont Trophy - Personality of the Year, Michel Therrien, Granby Prédateurs

See also
1997 Memorial Cup
1997 NHL Entry Draft
1996–97 OHL season
1996–97 WHL season

References
 Official QMJHL Website
 www.hockeydb.com/

Quebec Major Junior Hockey League seasons
QMJHL